Sart is a village in the district of Salihli, Manisa Province, Turkey. It is the location of ancient Sardes, the capital of Lydia.

References

Villages in Manisa Province
Lydia
Salihli